Butter is a dairy product made by churning fresh or fermented cream or milk.

Butter may also refer to:

 Butter (art fair), an annual art fair in Indianapolis
 Butter (surname)
 Butter Project, an online video-streaming platform
 Bhuttar, Pakistan, also spelled Butter, a village

Films
Butter (1998 film), an action film
Butter (2011 film), an ensemble comedy directed by Jim Field Smith
Butter (2020 film), a drama film starring Mira Sorvino

Music
 Butter (album), by Hudson Mohawke, 2009
 Butter (band), German metalcore band
 Butter 08, American alternative rock band

Songs
 "Butter" (song), by BTS, 2021
 "Butter", by A Tribe Called Quest, from the 1991 album The Low End Theory
 "Butter", by the Bloody Beetroots, 2008
 "Butter", by Triple One, 2019

See also
 
 
 Butters (disambiguation)
 Butter catfish (disambiguation)
 Butterbar (disambiguation)
 Buttar (disambiguation)
 Butterfly (disambiguation)
 Buttery (disambiguation)
 Butter-and-eggs (disambiguation)
 Hyena butter